XtratuM is a bare-metal hypervisor specially designed for embedded real-time systems available for the instruction sets LEON2/3/4 (SPARC v8), ARM v7 and V8 processors (TMS570, R5, A9, A52, A53) and RISC V processor. 

It was initially developed by the Universidad Politécnica de Valencia (Spain). XtratuM was released as free and open-source software, subject to the requirements of the GNU General Public License (GPL), version 2 or any later. 

A new version of XtratuM from scratch (XtratuM New Generation XNG) is commercialized by fentISS under a proprietary license. It has been qualified for critical systems.  

XtratuM is a hypervisor designed for embedded systems to meet safety critical real-time requirements. It provides a framework to run several operating systems (or real-time executives) in a robust partitioned environment. XtratuM can be used to build a MILS (Multiple Independent Levels of Security) architecture.

History 
The name XtratuM derives from the word stratum. In geology and related fields it means: 
Layer of rock or soil with internally consistent characteristics that distinguishes it from contiguous layers.

In order to stress the tight relation with Linux and the open-source movements, the “S” was replaced by “X”. XtratuM would be the first layer of software (the one closest to the hardware), which provides a solid basis for the rest of the system.

XtratuM 1.0 was initially designed as a substitution of the RTLinux HAL (Hardware Abstraction Layer) 
to meet temporal and spatial partitioning requirements. 
The goal was to
virtualize the essential hardware devices to execute several OSes concurrently, with at least one of these OSes being a RTOS. The other hardware devices (including booting) were left to a special
domain, named root domain.

After this experience, it was redesigned to be independent of Linux and
bootable. The result of this is XtratuM 2.0 which is type 1 hypervisor that uses para-virtualization. The
para-virtualized operations are as close to the hardware as
possible. Therefore, porting an operating system that already works on the
native system is a simple task: replace some parts of the operating system HAL with the corresponding hypercalls.

Overview 
The design of a hypervisor for critical real-time embedded systems follows these criteria:

 Strong temporal isolation: fixed cyclic scheduler.
 Strong spatial isolation: all partitions are executed in processor user mode, and do not share memory.
 Basic resource virtualization: clock and timers, interrupts, memory, CPU and special devices.
 Real-time scheduling policy for partition scheduling.
 Efficient context switch for partitions.
 Deterministic hypercalls (hypervisor system calls).
 Health monitoring support.
 Robust and efficient inter-partition communication mechanisms (sampling and queuing ports).
 Low overhead.
 Small size.
 Static system definition via configuration file (XML).

In the case of embedded systems, particularly avionics systems, the ARINC 653 standard defines a partitioning scheme. Although this standard was not designed to describe how a hypervisor must operate, some parts of the model are quite close to the functionality provided by a hypervisor.

The XtratuM API and internal operations resemble the ARINC 653 standard. XtratuM is not an ARINC 653 compliant system. The standard relies on the idea of a separation kernel defining both the API and operations of the partitions and also how the threads or processes are managed inside each partition.

XtratuM hypervisor supports the LEON 2/LEON 3/LEON 4 (SPARCv8) and Cortex R4/Cortex R5/Cortex A9 (ARMv7) architectures. 

XtratuM support as execution environments:

 XAL (XtratuM Abstraction Layer) for bare-C applications
 POSIX PSE51 Partikle RTOS
 ARINC-653 P1 compliant LITHOS RTOS 
 ARINC-653 P4 compliant uLITHOS runtime
 Ada Ravenscar profile ORK+
 RTEMS
 Linux

See also 

 Kernel-based Virtual Machine
 L4 microkernels
 Xen
 Paravirtualization
 Nanokernel

References

External links
 XtratuM Official Page
 fentISS

Free virtualization software
Virtualization software for Linux